Nicholas Lucien Leclerc (Ville-sur-Illon, 1816-Ville-sur-Illon, 1893) was a French military doctor, translator, and influential early western historian of medicine in the medieval Islamic world. He was an assistant military surgeon in Algeria from 1840-1844. His Histoire de la médecine arabe (Paris, 1876) was one of the first major histories of Arabic medicine, but has subsequently been superseded in many areas.

References

1816 births
1893 deaths
French orientalists
French Arabists
French male non-fiction writers